Spinosity is the debut extended play release by Australian pop-rock band The Sharp. It was released in September 1992 and peaked at number 28 on the ARIA Charts.

Track listing
 "Talking Sly" - 3:00
 "Dance for Me" - 2:48
 "Caught in the Deep" - 2:22
 "Restless Mind" - 3:05
 "Butterfly" - 3:16

Charts

Release history

References

1992 EPs
The Sharp albums
EPs by Australian artists